Magalí Romitelli (born 1987) was the contestant from Argentina in the Miss Universe 2006 pageant.

External links
article on Romitelli

References

1987 births
Argentine beauty pageant winners
Miss Universe 2006 contestants
Living people
People from Villa María
Date of birth missing (living people)